Julieta Norma Fierro Gossman (Mexico City, February 24, 1948) best known as Julieta Fierro is a Mexican astrophysicist and science communicator. She is a full researcher at the Institute of Astronomy and professor of the Sciences Faculty at the National Autonomous University of Mexico (UNAM). She is part of the Researchers National System in Mexico, holding a level III position. Since 2004 she is a member of the Mexican Academy of Language.  

Her research is focused on the study of interstellar medium and her latest research involves the study of the solar system. Nonetheless, she is most known for her science communication work. She holds three honris causa doctorates, and several laboratories, libraries, planetariums, astronomical societies, and schools have her name.

Biography
Julieta Fierro was born on February 24, 1948, in Mexico City. She studied physics at the UNAM School of Sciences and obtained her degree in 1974. Afterwards she earned a masters in Astrophysics at the same institution. She is a  researcher in the Institute of Astronomy at UNAM and a full professor at the  School of Sciences of the same university.   

From March 2000 to January 2004, she was UNAM's General Director of Scientific Outreach. She has been in positions such as vice president and president of the Education Commission of the International Astronomical Union and president of the Mexican Academy of Natural Sciences Teachers and of the Mexican Association of Science and Technology Museums. Furthermore, she belonged to the board of directors of the Astronomical Society of the Pacific, which is focused on communicating science to improve education.   

She was elected a member of the Academia Mexicana de la Lengua on July 24, 2003, and took possession of its 25th chair on August 26, 2004, with the lecture entitled Imaginemos un Caracol (Let's Imagine a Snail). She was elected a corresponding member of the Royal Spanish Academy on April 21, 2005.

Science communication 
Throughout her career, she has written 40 books, of which 23 are on popular science. She has published dozens of articles in national and international journals. One of her writings was published in Mayan (an indigenous language). With the purpose of communicating science to broader audiences, she has given hundreds of talks and lectures, and designed multiple workshops of science for kids. During 2020 she published a series of scientific activities to perform at home during the lockdown periods due to the COVID-19 pandemic.  

She participated in the creation of the astronomy room at  Universum, one of the most popular University museums in Latin America. She was the director of Universum and of the Museo Descubre of Aguascalientes. She collaborated on the creation of a science museum in Puerto Rico and the McDonald Observatory in the United States and the Sutherland in South Africa. She collaborates actively with Universum, the Museum of Natural Sciences, the Museo de la Luz (Museum of the Light), the McDonald Observatory in Texas and Puerto Rico, and with the Global Fair in Japan.  

She has participated in thousands of radio shows where she reads about science and talks about her passion for it. Sometimes she invites other scientists and interview them to enrich the conversation. She hosted a television series titled: Más allá de las estrellas (Beyond the Stars), which was chosen as the best science show in Mexico in 1998. Her most recent collabration with mexican TV was with Canal 11, a channel from the Instituto Politécnico Nacional with the TV show called Sofía Luna, agente espacial (Special Agent, Sofia Luna).

Selected publications 

La astronomía de México. Lectorum, 2001, . Reissued in 2005.
 Albert Einstein: Un científico de nuestro tiempo. Co-authored with Héctor Domínguez, Lectorum, 2005, .
 Lo grandioso de la luz, Gran paseo por la ciencia. Editorial Nuevo México, 2005, .
 Lo grandioso del tiempo, Gran paseo por la ciencia. Editorial Nuevo México, 2005, .
 Cartas Astrales: Un romance científico del tercer tipo. Co-authored with Adolfo Sánchez Valenzuela, Alfaguara, 2006, .
 La luz de las estrellas. Co-authored with Héctor Domínguez. Ediciones La Vasija, 2006, .
 Galileo y el telescopio, 400 años de ciencia. Co-authored with Héctor Domínguez. Uribe y Ferrari Editores, 2007, .
 Newton, la luz y el movimiento de los cuerpos. Co-authored with Héctor Domínguez. Uribe y Ferrari Editores, 2007, .

From the collection Ciencia para todos (science for everyone) from the Fondo de Cultura Económica in México, her main works are:
 La Evolución Química del Sol. Co-authored with Manuel Peimbert Sierra, 2012, .
 Nebulosas planetarias: la hermosa muerte de las estrellas. Co-authored with Silvia Torres Castilleja, 2009, .
 Fronteras el universo. Book complied by Manuel Peimbert Sierra (compiler), Silvia Torres Castilleja, Miguel Ángel Herrera, Miriam Peña, Luis Felipe Rodríguez, Dany Page, José Jesús González, Deborah Dultzin, 2000, . Wrote one chapter about planetary systems.
 La familia del Sol, co-authored with Miguel Ángel Herrera, 1989, .

Awards and recognitions
Throughout her career she has been awarded with multiple prizes and her work recognized by different institutons:   
 Third World Network of Scientific Organizations outreach award, 1992.
 Kalinga Prize, UNESCO, 1995.
 Primo Rovis Gold Medal, Trieste Center of Astrophysical Theory, 1996. 
 Klumpke-Roberts Award, Astronomical Society of the Pacific, 1998. 
 National Award for Science Journalism, 1998.
 Latin American Award for the Popularization of Science, Chile, 2001. 
 Citizen's Medal of Merit from the Mexico City Assembly of Representatives, 2003.
 Benito Juárez Medal, 2004.
 Flama Recognition, Autonomous University of Nuevo León, 2005
 Vasco de Quiroga Medal, 2011. 
 TWAS-ROLAC Regional Prize, 2017. 
 Medal for the Scientific Merit, 2021. Engineer Mario Molina.

Honorary Degrees 

 2006: Awarded by CITEM
 2009: Awarded by Coordinadora de Identidades Territoriales Mapuche and Michoacan University of Saint Nicholas of Hidalgo.
 2017: Awarded by Universidad Autónoma Benito Juárez de Oaxaca.

References

External links
 Julieta Norma Fierro Gossman at the UNAM Institute of Astronomy 
 

1948 births
20th-century Mexican scientists
21st-century Mexican scientists
20th-century Mexican women writers
20th-century Mexican writers
21st-century Mexican women writers
Kalinga Prize recipients
Living people
Members of the Mexican Academy of Language
Mexican astrophysicists
Mexican women physicists
National Autonomous University of Mexico alumni
Academic staff of the National Autonomous University of Mexico
Science writers
Scientists from Mexico City
Women science writers
Writers from Mexico City
20th-century Mexican women scientists
21st-century Mexican women scientists
20th-century women physicists